Rassvet is a rural locality (a settlement) in Martovsky Selsoviet, Khabarsky District, Altai Krai, Russia. The population was 285 as of 2013. There are 4 streets.

Geography 
Rassvet is located 23 km southwest of Khabary (the district's administrative centre) by road. Novoilyinka is the nearest rural locality.

References 

Rural localities in Khabarsky District